The Enertia is an electric motorcycle designed and sold by Brammo, Inc. It uses a Lithium iron phosphate battery, and is intended as a commuter vehicle.  Enertia motorcycles first went on sale in late July 2009, and began selling at Best Buy in August 2009.

Construction and components
The body uses monocoque construction. Early prototypes used carbon fiber as the principal material, but Brammo later decided to produce the monocoque body out of aluminum.  Some of the bike's components are made entirely of recycled material, while the body panels are created from a mixed percentage of recycled and new materials.  

The vehicle's batteries can be recharged via the onboard charger within three hours by plugging into a standard 110 volt electrical outlet.

Brammo has stated the Enertia does not have regenerative braking because of the limited benefit that current regenerative braking technology provides to motorcycles, and the risk of traction problems.

According to Cycle World magazine, "With its wide, mild-rise handlebar, sporty steering geometry and narrow 18-inch-front/17-inch-rear Avon RoadRiders, the Enertia is a light and responsive handler." The road test editor recorded a 0-60 mph time of 16.1 seconds, and a quarter-mile run of 20.19 seconds at 60.78 mph.   

The current testing versions of the Enertia being shown to the media are described as enjoyable to ride, nimble and easy to control.

Most of the cost of the motorcycle is due to the battery.  Brammo is hoping for the cost of this component to fall in the future, and is talking of creating a program to lease rather than own the battery.

Comparison with conventional motorcycles

With a battery pack capacity of 3.1 kW·h, the annual consumption of electricity would be 806 kW·h.

References

External links
Brammo Website
Review, KneeSlider
Review, Wired

Enertia
Motorcycles introduced in 2009
Electric motorcycles